The Chinanteco deer mouse (Habromys chinanteco) is a species of rodent in the family Cricetidae. It is endemic to Mexico.

This species is known to live in only one location, on Cerro Pelón in the Sierra Juarez, Oaxaca, between 2,080 and 2,650 meters elevation.

References

Musser, G. G. and M. D. Carleton. 2005. Superfamily Muroidea. pp. 894–1531 in Mammal Species of the World a Taxonomic and Geographic Reference. D. E. Wilson and D. M. Reeder eds. Johns Hopkins University Press, Baltimore.

Habromys
Endemic mammals of Mexico
Fauna of the Sierra Madre de Oaxaca
Rodents of North America
Critically endangered biota of Mexico
Critically endangered fauna of North America
Mammals described in 1976
Taxonomy articles created by Polbot